Lebonah was a town near Shiloh, on the north side of Bethel, mentioned in the Hebrew Bible. It has been identified with Al-Lubban ash-Sharqiya, to the south of Nablus.

In Hebrew, Lebonah means frankincense, and is used in this meaning in all other appearances in the Hebrew Bible. The nearby Israeli community of Ma'ale Levona, located near this site, takes its name from Lebonah.

References

Hebrew Bible cities